Hold Your Horses may refer to:
 Hold your horses, a common idiom to mean "hold on" or wait
 Hold Your Horses (film), a 1921 American silent film directed by  E. Mason Hopper
 Hold Your Horses (First Choice album), 1979
 Hold Your Horses (Ella Edmondson album), 2009

See also
Hold Your Horse Is, a 2002 album by Hella